The Nunavut Court of Justice (NUCJ; , Nunavuumi Iqkaqtuijikkut; Inuinnaqtun: Nunavunmi Maligaliuqtiit) is the superior court and territorial court of the Canadian territory of Nunavut. It is administered from the Nunavut Justice Centre (Building #510) in Iqaluit.

It was established on April 1, 1999 as Canada's only "unified" or single-level court with the consent of Canada, the Office of the Interim Commissioner of Nunavut and Nunavut Tunngavik Inc., the Inuit Land Claims representative organization. Prior to the establishment of Nunavut as a separate territory justice was administered through two courts, the Territorial Court of the Northwest Territories and the Supreme Court of the Northwest Territories.

Besides court proceedings in Iqaluit the judges travel as a  circuit court  to communities throughout the territory to conduct cases.

Judges

Current judges

Past Judges

References

External links 
 

Nunavut courts
Nunavut
Nunavut
Justices
1999 establishments in Nunavut
Courts and tribunals established in 1999